Alan Manning Chambers (born February 21, 1972) is the former president of Exodus International and co-founder of Speak. Love., headquartered in Orlando, Florida. Before coming to Exodus, Chambers served on the pastoral team at Calvary Assembly of God, one of the largest churches in Orlando.

On June 19, 2013, Chambers repudiated the Exodus International's mission in a nearly hour-long talk at the organization's 38th annual meeting. He co-founded Speak. Love. with two other former Exodus leaders later that year.

Background
Chambers was actively involved in promoting policies that in his view preserve and protect traditional marriage and the family. He testified before the Massachusetts state judiciary committee on same-sex marriage.  He was also a member of the Arlington Group, a coalition working to pass legislation against same-sex marriage.

Chambers stated that he had mostly overcome his attraction to men (although he did speak openly about his own ongoing sexual attraction to men); however, he rejects the term ex-gay. He is married to Leslie Chambers and has two adopted children. He traveled extensively and was a frequent speaker and guest lecturer at conferences, churches and college campuses. He debated at many university campuses, such as the University of California at Berkeley, Pepperdine University and Reformed Theological Seminary.

Prior to Exodus International's annual conference in 2012, Chambers stated, "I do not believe that cure is a word that is applicable to really any struggle, homosexuality included....  For someone to put out a shingle and say, "I can cure homosexuality" — that to me is as bizarre as someone saying they can cure any other common temptation or struggle that anyone faces on Planet Earth." In July 2012, while appearing on NBC's Hardball, Chambers stated that he always believed the catchphrase "Pray away the gay" to be a lazy stereotype and one that he never used, as it invalidates the nature of the complex issue surrounding homosexuality. Chambers went on to tell host Michael Smerconish that he has same-sex attraction, and for anyone to say he does not have temptations, or that he could never be tempted, or does not have same-sex attraction is not true. He has admitted to having experienced attraction to both sexes.

In June 2013, he closed the organization with a public apology to the LGBT community, saying that "For quite some time we’ve been imprisoned in a worldview that’s neither honoring toward our fellow human beings, nor biblical." He remarked that he will now seek to create "safe, welcoming and mutually transforming communities.”

In 2015, Chambers published a book entitled, My Exodus: From Fear to Grace.

Accolades
In 2011, WORLD named Chambers as their "Daniel of the Year," for his stance on Christian issues. Chambers was listed in Charisma magazine as one of the top Christian leaders who represent the future of the American church.

See also

 Ex-gay movement

References

External links 

 

 

1972 births
Living people
Ex-gay movement
People self-identified as ex-ex-gay
American Assemblies of God pastors
People from Orlando, Florida